In mathematics, a branched covering is a map that is almost a covering map, except on a small set.

In topology
In topology, a map is a branched covering if it is a covering map everywhere except for a nowhere dense set known as the branch set. Examples include the map from a wedge of circles to a single circle, where the map is a homeomorphism on each circle.

In algebraic geometry

In algebraic geometry, the term branched covering is used to describe morphisms  from an algebraic variety  to another one , the two dimensions being the same, and the typical fibre of  being of dimension 0.

Depending on the context, we can take this as local homeomorphism for the strong topology, over the complex numbers, or as an étale morphism in general (under some slightly stronger hypotheses, on flatness and separability). Generically, then, such a morphism resembles a covering space in the topological sense.

.

Ramification locus
In general monodromy occurs according to the fundamental group of   acting on the sheets of the covering (this topological picture can be made precise also in the case of a general base field).

Kummer extensions
Branched coverings are easily constructed as Kummer extensions, i.e. as algebraic extension of the function field. The hyperelliptic curves are prototypic examples.

Unramified covering
An unramified covering then is the occurrence of an empty ramification locus.

Examples

Elliptic curve
Morphisms of curves provide many examples of ramified coverings. For example, let  be the elliptic curve of equation

The projection of   onto the -axis is a ramified cover with ramification locus given by

This projection induces an algebraic extension of degree two of the function fields:
Also, if we take the fraction fields of the underlying commutative rings, we get the morphism

Hence this projection is a degree 2 branched covering. This can be homogenized to construct a degree 2 branched covering of the corresponding projective elliptic curve to the projective line.

Plane algebraic curve

The previous example may be generalized to any algebraic plane curve in the following way.
Let  be a plane curve defined by the equation , where   is a separable and irreducible polynomial in two indeterminates. Thus, this projection is a branched covering of degree .

Over a root  of the discriminant, there is at least a ramified point, which is either a critical point or a singular point.

The fact that this projection is a branched covering of degree  may also be seen by considering the function fields. In fact, this projection corresponds to the field extension of degree

Varying Ramifications
We can also generalize branched coverings of the line with varying ramification degrees. Consider a polynomial of the form

as we choose different points , the fibers given by the vanishing locus of  vary. At any point where the multiplicity of one of the linear terms in the factorization of  increases by one, there is a ramification.

Scheme Theoretic Examples

Elliptic Curves
Morphisms of curves provide many examples of ramified coverings of schemes. For example, the morphism from an affine elliptic curve to a line

is a ramified cover with ramification locus given by

Also, if we take the fraction fields of the underlying commutative rings, we get the field homomorphism

which is an algebraic extension of degree two;
hence we got a degree 2 branched covering of an elliptic curve to the affine line.

Hyperelliptic curve
 where  for

Higher Degree Coverings of the Affine Line
We can generalize the previous example by taking the morphism

where  has no repeated roots. Then the ramification locus is given by

where the fibers are given by

Then, we get an induced morphism of fraction fields

There is an -module isomorphism of the target with

Hence the cover is of degree .

Superelliptic Curves
Superelliptic curves are a generalization of hyperelliptic curves and a specialization of the previous family of examples since they are given by affine schemes  from polynomials of the form
 where  and  has no repeated roots.

Ramified Coverings of Projective Space
Another useful class of examples come from ramified coverings of projective space.

by considering the morphism of projective schemes

Again, this will be a covering of degree .

Applications
Branched coverings  come with a symmetry group of transformations . Since the symmetry group has stabilizers at the points of the ramification locus, branched coverings can be used to construct examples of orbifolds, or Deligne–Mumford stacks.

See also
 Étale morphism
 Orbifold
 Stack (mathematics)

References
 
 
 

Complex manifolds
Algebraic varieties